Ralph Browne "Chip" Ingram II (born June 21, 1954) is an American Christian pastor, author, and teacher. He is the founder, teaching pastor, and chief executive officer of Living on the Edge, an international teaching and discipleship ministry. A pastor for over 30 years, Chip is the author of many books, including Culture Shock, The Real Heaven, The Real God, The Invisible War, and Love, Sex, and Lasting Relationships.

Early life 
Originally from Columbus, Ohio, Ingram grew up in what he called "a negative religious environment". In his book Living on the Edge: Dare to Experience True Spirituality, Ingram recounts growing up in a church that did not believe in the Bible or in having a personal relationship with Jesus Christ: "We read our prayers, we said the right things, we fulfilled our religious duty, and then we went home. There was absolutely no expectation that what we did on Sunday would have any impact on how we lived the rest of the week.”

As a result, by the time Ingram was a teenager, he was disengaged from church and God. He recalls, "I wanted to believe, but the older I got, the less interested I became in going through the religious motions and pretending and saying things that no one lived or believed."

The intersection of faith and basketball 
Ingram went on to graduate from West Liberty State College in 1976. Afterwards, he received an invitation from Sports Ambassadors to travel overseas with other college basketball players from around the nation using basketball as a vehicle for evangelism. During the next two summers he would go on to ball out on "dem folks", dunking on people, then spreading the Gospel to them. Ingram toured the Caribbean, South America, and Asia with three international basketball teams, a trip that he said to be the turning point of his life.

While he was on tour, he caught a vision that God could use an ordinary person like him to accomplish extraordinary things. Ingram started to believe that God was not calling him to coach athletes, but to "coach" people for Jesus Christ and become a pastor.

Ministry 

In 1982, Ingram began his pastoral ministry at Country Bible Church in Kaufman, Texas, a rural community near Dallas. Under his leadership, the church grew from 30 to 500 people. In 1990, he became the senior pastor for Santa Cruz Bible Church in Santa Cruz, California, where he led a church congregation of 1,000 that grew to over 4,000.

In 1995, he founded Living on the Edge as a nationally syndicated radio ministry; it has since grown into an international Christian discipleship ministry. In 2003 Ingram moved to Atlanta, Georgia, to become president and chief executive officer of Walk Thru the Bible Ministries, succeeding Bruce Wilkinson.

In 2009, Ingram became the senior pastor for Venture Christian Church in Los Gatos, California, where he served until 2018.

Today, Ingram serves as chief executive officer and teaching pastor of Living on the Edge. He is the author of 15 books and several studies for small-group ministry.

Education 

Ingram completed his undergraduate work at West Liberty State College, and went on to earn a Master of Education from West Virginia University and a Master of Theology from Dallas Theological Seminary.

Family 
Ingram and his wife, Theresa, have four children (including the songwriter Jason Ingram) and 12 grandchildren.

Works

References

External links 

 Living on the Edge (http://www.livingontheedge.org)
 Culture Shock (http://www.cultureshockthebook.com/)

1954 births
Living people
20th-century American non-fiction writers
20th-century Christians
20th-century American male writers
21st-century American non-fiction writers
21st-century Christians
21st-century American male writers
Activists from California
Activists from Ohio
American Christian religious leaders
American Christian writers
American evangelicals
American motivational writers
American radio personalities
Christians from California
Converts to Christianity
Writers from California
Writers from Columbus, Ohio
West Liberty University alumni